The presiding officer of the United States Senate is the person who presides over the United States Senate and is charged with maintaining order and decorum, recognizing members to speak, and interpreting the Senate's rules, practices, and precedents. Senate presiding officer is a role, not an actual office. The actual role is usually performed by one of three officials: the vice president of the United States; an elected United States senator; or, under certain circumstances, the chief justice of the United States. Outside the constitutionally mandated roles, the actual appointment of a person to do the job of presiding over the Senate as a body is governed by Rule I of the Standing Rules.

The United States Constitution establishes the vice president as president of the Senate, with the authority to cast a tie-breaking vote. Early vice presidents took an active role in regularly presiding over proceedings of the body, with the president pro tempore only being called on during the vice president's absence. During the 20th century, the role of the vice president evolved into more of an executive branch position. Now, the vice president is usually seen as an integral part of a president's administration and presides over the Senate only on ceremonial occasions or when a tie-breaking vote may be needed. It is now often used as one of the forms of checks and balances by the executive branch to the legislative.

The Constitution also provides for the selection of one of the elected senators to serve as its president pro tempore. This senator presides when the vice president is absent from the body. The president pro tempore is selected by the body specifically for the role of presiding in the absence of (as the meaning of pro tempore, literally "for the time being") the actual presiding officer. By tradition, the title of President pro tempore has come to be given more-or-less automatically to the most senior senator of the majority party. In actual practice in the modern Senate, the president pro tempore also does not often serve in the role (though it is their constitutional right to do so). Instead, as governed by Rule I, they frequently designate a junior senator to preside.

When the Senate hears an impeachment trial of the incumbent president of the United States, by the procedure established in the Constitution, the chief justice presides.

Constitutional authority
The Constitution provides for two officers to preside over the Senate. Article One, Section 3, Clause 4 designates the vice president of the United States as the president of the Senate. In this capacity, the vice president was expected to preside at regular sessions of the Senate, casting votes only to break ties. From John Adams in 1789 to Richard Nixon in the 1950s, presiding over the Senate was the chief function of vice presidents, who had an office in the Capitol, received their staff support and office expenses through the legislative appropriations, and rarely were invited to participate in cabinet meetings or other executive activities. In 1961, Vice President Lyndon B. Johnson changed the vice presidency by moving his chief office from the Capitol to the White House, by directing his attention to executive functions, and by attending Senate sessions only at critical times when his vote, or ruling from the chair, might be necessary. Vice presidents since Johnson's time have followed his example.

Next, Article One, Section 3, Clause 5 provides that in the absence of the vice president the Senate could choose a president pro tempore to temporarily preside and perform the duties of the chair. Since vice presidents presided routinely in the 18th and 19th centuries, the Senate thought it necessary to choose a president pro tempore only for the limited periods when the vice president might be ill or otherwise absent. As a result, the Senate frequently elected several presidents pro tempore during a single session.

On three occasions during the 19th century, the Senate was without both a president and a president pro tempore:
 July 9–11, 1850, following Millard Fillmore's accession to the presidency upon the death of Zachary Taylor, until William R. King was elected president pro tempore;
 September 19–October 10, 1881, following Chester Arthur's accession to the presidency upon the death of James A. Garfield, until Thomas F. Bayard was elected president pro tempore;
 November 25–December 7, 1885, following the death of Vice President Thomas A. Hendricks, until John Sherman was elected president pro tempore.

Additionally, Article One, Section 3, Clause 6 grants to the Senate the sole power to try federal impeachments and spells out the basic procedures for impeachment trials. Among the requirements is the stipulation that the chief justice is to preside over presidential impeachment trials. This rule underscores the solemnity of the occasion and aims, in part, to avoid the possible conflict of interest of a vice president's presiding over the proceeding for the removal of the one official standing between the vice president and the presidency. The chief justice has presided as such only three times:
 Chief Justice Salmon P. Chase presided over the impeachment trial of Andrew Johnson in 1868;
 Chief Justice William H. Rehnquist presided over the impeachment trial of Bill Clinton in 1999;
 Chief Justice John Roberts presided over the first impeachment trial of Donald Trump in 2020.

According to Article One, Section 5, Clause 2 of the U.S. Constitution, the Senate is allowed to establish, for itself, its own rules of operations, including the roles and duties of the presiding officer.  Those rules are known as the Standing Rules of the United States Senate, and Rule I deals with the appointment of a person to act as the chair, or presiding officer, for normal Senate proceedings.  It recognizes the constitutionally mandated roles of vice president and president pro tempore, but goes further to allow for the appointment of an acting president pro tempore, and further allows for the president pro tempore to also designate any other senator to perform his duties. As a result, during the day-to-day operation of the body, it is rare for the actual presiding role to be handled by the president pro tempore (and rarer still for the vice president to do so). Instead, a designated junior senator is most commonly appointed to do the job.

Manner of address
The presiding officer is usually addressed as "Mr. President" or "Madam President." During impeachment trials of the president, the chief justice is referred to as "Mr. Chief Justice.”

During joint sessions of Congress in which the president of the United States is giving the address, practices have varied as to how the president of the United States refers to the vice president. It was the custom for earlier presidents up to George H. W. Bush to refer to the vice president as "Mr. President" while addressing a joint session of Congress, in deference to their role as president of the Senate. Every president since Bill Clinton have since addressed the vice president acting as Senate president as “Mr./Madam Vice President”.

List of presiding officers

This list includes all presidents of the Senate (the vice presidents of the United States), those presidents pro tempore of the Senate who presided during intra–term vacancies in the vice presidency or when the vice president was acting as president of the United States, and those chief justices who presided during presidential impeachment trials. It does not include presidents pro tempore who presided over sessions temporarily during an absence of the Senate president, or junior senators designated by the president pro tempore to preside temporarily.

See also
 List of vice presidents of the United States
 List of presidents pro tempore of the United States Senate
 Speaker of the United States House of Representatives, the presiding officer of the United States House of Representatives

Notes

References

Leaders of the United States Senate
Vice presidency of the United States